The 2023 Albany Great Danes football team will represent University at Albany, SUNY as a member of the Colonial Athletic Association during the 2023 NCAA Division I FCS football season. They are led by head coach Greg Gattuso, who will coach his tenth season with the program. The Great Danes play their home games at Bob Ford Field at Tom & Mary Casey Stadium in Albany, New York.

Previous season

The Great Danes finished the 2022 season with an overall record of 3–8 and a mark of 2–6 in CAA conference play to finish tied-sixth place.

Schedule

Game summaries

Fordham

at Hawaii

at Morgan State

Villanova

at Towson

at New Hampshire

Rhode Island

at Maine

William & Mary

at Stony Brook

Monmouth

Personnel

Coaching staff

Roster

Statistics

Team

Individual leaders

Defense

Key: POS: Position, SOLO: Solo Tackles, AST: Assisted Tackles, TOT: Total Tackles, TFL: Tackles-for-loss, SACK: Quarterback Sacks, INT: Interceptions, BU: Passes Broken Up, PD: Passes Defended, QBH: Quarterback Hits, FR: Fumbles Recovered, FF: Forced Fumbles, BLK: Kicks or Punts Blocked, SAF: Safeties, TD : Touchdown

Special teams

References

Albany Great Danes
Albany Great Danes football seasons
Albany Great Danes